The 1995 CAF Cup was the fourth football club tournament season that took place for the runners-up of each African country's domestic league. It was won by ES Sahel in two-legged final victory against AS Kaloum Star.

First round

|}

Notes
1 SC Atlético were disqualified because the Cape Verdean Football Federation did not name its entrant in time.
teams from Chad, Ethiopia, Kenya, Madagascar, Mauritania and Namibia were disqualified because their federations were in debt to CAF.

Second round

|}

Quarter-finals

|}

Semi-finals

|}

Final

|}

Winners

External links
CAF Cup 1995 - rsssf.com

3
CAF Cup